Iiro Markku Verner Helminen (16 October 1946 – March 2016), better known simply as Markku Helminen, was a Finnish former motorcycle speedway rider.

Born in Lahti, Helminen began his career in the early 1970s in Finland with the Salpausselan team, and also represented Finland in international competition. In 1977 he signed for British League team Leicester Lions. He rode in 22 matches for the Lions, averaging just over three points per match, before being released. He rode in one match for Wolverhampton Wolves the same year.

References

1946 births
2016 deaths
Sportspeople from Lahti
Finnish speedway riders
Wolverhampton Wolves riders
Leicester Lions riders